Kleppestø is the administrative centre of the municipality of Askøy in Vestland county, Norway.  The village is located on the southern coast of the island of Askøy.  The village of Florvåg lies just north of Kleppestø and the village of Strusshamn lies to the west. Kleppestø is connected to the city of Bergen by ferry and by the Askøy Bridge.

References

Villages in Vestland
Askøy